This is a list of bridges in Sichuan, China.

Bridges

Bingcaogang Bridge
Bosideng Bridge
Fujiang Bridge
Kuige Bridge
Labajin Bridge
Luding Bridge
Luding Yaye Expressway Bridge
Miaoziping Bridge
Nanxi Bridge
Qiancao Bridge
Qianwei Bridge
Rongzhou Bridge
Taian Yangtze River Bridge
Xiaonanmen Bridge
Xipan Bridge
Yibin Bridge
Zhaohua Jialing Jiang Bridge
Zhongba Bridge

See also
List of bridges in China
Yangtze River bridges and tunnels

Bridges in Sichuan
Sichuan